Seventy Mile is a locality in the Charters Towers Region, Queensland, Australia.

Geography 
The former Mount Leyshon which was excavated as part of the Mount Leyshon gold mine was located in the north-west of the locality.

History 
Mount Leyshon Provisional School opened circa 1890 and became Mount Leyshon State School on 1 January 1909. It closed in 1927 due to low attendances. It reopened in 1930 before finally closing circa 1931.

The Mount Leyshon mine reopened as an open pit mine in 1987 and operated until 2002. During that time, it produced 2.5 million ounces of gold  2.3 million ounces of silver.

References 

Charters Towers Region
Localities in Queensland